Liu Jingnan (born July 1, 1943) is a Chinese geodesist and educator. He earned his bachelor's and master's degrees at the Wuhan Institute of Surveying and Mapping (now the School of Geodesy and Geomatics, Wuhan University), and worked at Hunan Provincial Coalfield Physical Test Team, Xiangtan Mining Institute and Wuhan University. In 1999, he was elected a member of Chinese Academy of Engineering. He served as the President of Wuhan University from 2003 to 2008, and the inaugural Chancellor of Duke Kunshan University from 2012.

Liu's early research focused on transformation models in satellite positioning technology, and developed several related software systems. And under his leadership developed the first GPS satellite positioning data processing system in China. He also took part in the design of National High Precision GPS Network.

References

1943 births
Living people
Engineers from Chongqing
Members of the Chinese Academy of Engineering
Presidents of Wuhan University
Scientists from Chongqing
Educators from Chongqing
Wuhan University alumni